MV Skorpios I was a Chile-registered cruise ship owned and operated by Cruceros Skorpios. She had simple decorated wood style interior and copper plates covering the hull to avoid ice shocks at the wood structure. The ship was scrapped on 25 October 2018.

Gallery

External links 
   Cruceros Skorpios  (Spanish)

References 

Cruise ships
1978 ships